Arthur Norton Milgram (3 June 1912, in Philadelphia – 30 January 1961) was an American mathematician. He made contributions in functional analysis, combinatorics, differential geometry, topology, partial differential equations, and Galois theory. Perhaps one of his more famous contributions is the Lax–Milgram theorem—a theorem in functional analysis that is particularly applicable in the study of partial differential equations. In the third chapter of Emil Artin's book Galois Theory, Milgram also discussed some applications of Galois theory. Milgram also contributed to graph theory, by co-authoring the article Verallgemeinerung eines graphentheoretischen Satzes von Rédei with Tibor Gallai in 1960.

Milgram received his Ph.D. from the University of Pennsylvania in 1937. He worked under the supervision of John Kline  (a student of Robert Lee Moore). His dissertation was titled "Decompositions and Dimension of Closed Sets in ".

Milgram advised 2 students at Syracuse University in the 1940s and 1950s (Robert M. Exner  and Adnah Kostenbauder ). In the 1950s, Milgram moved to the University of Minnesota at Minneapolis and helped found Minnesota's well-known PDE group. At Minnesota, Milgram was also the Ph.D. advisor for Robert Duke Adams . It is also worth noting that Milgram's son R. James (Richard) Milgram  (Professor Emeritus at Stanford ) also studied mathematics and received his Ph.D. from Minnesota.

Selected publications

.
.

See also
Babuška–Lax–Milgram theorem
Fichera's existence principle
Lions–Lax–Milgram theorem
List of Jewish American mathematicians

Notes

References
.
.
.

External links

20th-century American mathematicians
Combinatorialists
Differential geometers
Mathematical analysts
Topologists
Mathematicians from New York (state)
Jewish American scientists
University of Minnesota faculty
Syracuse University faculty
Institute for Advanced Study visiting scholars
University of Notre Dame faculty
University of Pennsylvania alumni
1912 births
1960 deaths